The  is a Japanese speculative fiction award given each year for the best science fiction works and achievements during the previous calendar year. It is the oldest SF award in Japan, being given since the 9th Japan Science Fiction Convention in 1970.

"Seiun", the Japanese word for "nebula", was taken from the first professional science fiction magazine in Japan, which had a short run in 1954. The award is not related to the American Nebula Award.

It is similar to the Hugo Award, which is presented by the members of the World Science Fiction Society, in that all of the members of the presenting convention are eligible to participate in the selection process, though it is not a one-on-one comparison as the Hugo Awards are open to works from anywhere in any language, while the Seiun is implicitly limited to works released in Japan and written in or translated to Japanese.

Eligibility and the selection process 
A professional work or achievement which appeared for the first time in the previous calendar year may be considered eligible. The eligibility of magazines is determined via nominal publication date, which often tend to be a month or two ahead of the actual date due to Japanese publication customs.

There are no written rules about word count for literary fiction categories, so that the decision of eligibility in that regard is left up to the voters.

Usually in spring, SFFAN issues reference nominee lists for reference in each category, which is chosen by the preliminary vote of their member groups. However, voters can cast their ballots for any eligible works outside of the list in the final ballot.

With consideration for voters' availability, a work which appears in a magazine (such as a part of serialized works or short story) or released as audio-visual media (such as a TV show or film) but wasn't chosen for the reference nominee lists may be eligible again if published as a book or released in any other media format.

Categories 
There are effectively no official English names for categories, so they vary depending on translators. For example, "Long Work" may be written as "Long Story", "Long Form", or "Novel"; "Short Story" may be referred to as "Short Form" and so on.

Winners and candidates

Best Japanese Long Work 

  *   Winners and joint winners
  +   No winner selected

Best Japanese Short Story

Best Translated Long Work 

  *   Winners and joint winners
  +   No winner selected

Best Translated Short Story 
  *   Winners and joint winners
  +   No winner selected

Best Dramatic Presentation 
  *   Winners and joint winners
  +   No winner selected
 Denotes a Japanese work

Best Comic

Best Artist

Best Nonfiction

Free Nomination

Special Award 
SFFAN may give out special awards, which are not voted on. They are regarded as official Seiun Awards. All but one, Uchūjin, of them were given posthumously for people who contributed Japanese SF fandom.

See also

 List of manga awards
 Nihon SF Taisho Award
 Hayakawa's S-F Magazine Reader's Award

Notes

References
 
 
 

Awards established in 1970
Japanese science fiction awards
S
Manga awards
1970 establishments in Japan
Science fiction awards